Bajgan (also Romanized as Bājgān; also known as Bājgūn, Bājīgān, and Būjīgān) is a village in Sabzdasht Rural District, in the Central District of Bafq County, Yazd Province, Iran. At the 2006 census, its population was 161, in 63 families.

References 

Populated places in Bafq County